The Asian Journal of Andrology is a quarterly peer-reviewed medical journal covering andrology. It was established in 1999 and is the official journal of the Asian Society of Andrology. An open access journal, it is published by the Shanghai Institute of Materia Medica and the editor-in-chief is Yi-Fei Wang (Shanghai Jiao Tong University).

Abstracting and indexing
The journal is abstracted and indexed in:
Chemical Abstracts
EMBASE/Excerpta Medica
Index Medicus/MEDLINE/PubMed
Current Contents/Clinical Medicine
CSA Life Sciences
BIOSIS Previews
CAB Abstracts
CAB Health
PASCAL
Science Citation Index
According to the Journal Citation Reports, the journal has a 2017 impact factor of 3.259.

References

External links

Publications established in 1999
Quarterly journals
Open access journals
Andrology journals
English-language journals
Medknow Publications academic journals
1999 establishments in China